Vicky Molyneux (born 3 February 1988) is an English rugby league footballer who represents  internationally and plays at domestic level for Wigan Warriors.

Molyneux is from Rochdale and is the daughter of former Wigan player Jimmy Molyneux and started playing rugby league at a young age.  Her first open-age club was Hillside Hawks and it was while at Hillside that Molyneux was first selected by England, making her international debut against  in July 2007.

After playing for Hillside and Leigh East and taking time out from the game, Molyneux joined Wigan Warriors in the Women's Super League in 2019.  The same year Molyneux was captain of the Great Britain Teachers rugby league team.

A recall to the England squad, 14 years after her previous appearance, came in 2021 when she was picked to play against Wales in 2021. A third cap came in the 2021 game against France.  Molyneux was selected for England for the 2021 Women's Rugby League World Cup and played in three of England's four matches being named Player of the Match in the 54–4 win over the Canada Ravens  Molyneux was one of four England players named in the World Cup Women's Team of the Tournament.

References

Living people
1988 births
Rugby league players from Rochdale
England women's national rugby league team players
Wigan Warriors players
Rugby league locks